Luis Javier Rodríguez Moroy (born 1944) is a Spanish politician and former President of La Rioja between 1982 and 1983. He resigned the post after losing his seat in the 1982 Congress of Deputies election, as the condition of deputy was a requirement for maintaining the office of president.

References

Presidents of La Rioja (Spain)
1944 births
Living people